The Fairphone 3 and 3+ are touchscreen-based smartphones made by Fairphone. The phone has a modular, repairable design and is "constructed out of responsibly-sourced, conflict-free, and recycled materials where possible". It went on sale on September 3rd, 2019. It comes with Android 9 "Pie" installed.

The phone has a FullHD+ screen (2160 × 1080 pixels) with Gorilla Glass, 12 MP rear camera, 3,000 mAh battery, 64 GB storage with microSD, Qualcomm Snapdragon 632 processor, 4 GB RAM, 8 MP front camera (16 MP on Fairphone 3+), NFC and dual SIM. At launch the Fairphone 3 retailed at £408.

The Fairphone 3+, launched in August 2020, has upgraded front and rear cameras and speaker module. The cameras modules are compatible with the FP3. The improved audio largely comes from the new core module in the FP3+ and is not upgradable as this is IEMI related.

The Fairphone 3+ shipped with Android 10 and an increase in the amount of recycled plastic it contains, now 40%.

Ethical manufacturing and sustainable materials
Fairphone 3 "has been manufactured in a factory that pays the local living wage". "The tin and tungsten used in its construction is conflict free, the gold is Fairtrade, and the copper and plastics are recycled."

Modular design

The phone's modular design—it is constructed out of seven modules—makes it easier to repair than most smartphones. The rear of the phone can be removed without using tools. Having removed the rear, the battery can be lifted out and replaced. Using a regular Phillips #00 screwdriver, the display is easily removed and the modules are held in using only press fit sockets. The motherboard, containing the system on a chip, RAM and storage, can also be easily removed but the motherboard's individual components can not be easily replaced.

Reception
Sophie Charara, writing in Wired, said that the phone's technical specification is "almost identical to the Moto G7, our current recommendation for the best budget phone." She considered it "important" that "the premium for choosing an ethical phone had dropped to below £200" "for the first time".

iFixit gave it a 10 out of 10 repairability score, 10 is easiest to repair.

Fairphone 3+
The Fairphone 3+ was launched in August 2020. It has upgraded front and rear cameras, improved audio, an increase in the amount of recycled plastic it contains (40% rather than 9%) and Android 10. The rear camera has a larger sensor, intelligent scene detection and a higher dynamic range. The front camera has a bigger sensor and a higher dynamic range. The new cameras and speaker are alternatively available as modules that can be swapped in the original Fairphone 3.

The audio improvements cannot be achieved purely by a speaker module upgrade. The speaker module is only for the rear/side speaker and output is only improved if the new core module for the FP3+ is used.

Fair trade: wages

Building on its Worker Welfare Fund, Fairphone is in the process of rolling out bonus pay to Taiwan-based Arima's factory of 500 workers in Suzhou, China where Fairphone's devices are manufactured. The bonus will be paid to bring wages up to living wages and while initially it was going to be paid only to workers on the Fairphone line, after discussions with workers and management "they indicated that it's a better idea to spread the bonus over the whole company to avoid tensions." There's also a second bonus fund, which takes the form of a "higher product price to Arima" for making progress on working conditions and worker satisfaction.

See also
 Phonebloks
 Electronics right to repair

References

External links 

 
 Fairphone 3 Teardown by iFixit

Fair trade brands
Android (operating system) devices
Modular smartphones
Mobile phones with user-replaceable battery
Mobile phones introduced in 2019
Smartphones